The 1998 Saxony-Anhalt state election was held on 26 April 1998 to elect the members of the 3rd Landtag of Saxony-Anhalt. The incumbent government was a minority coalition of the Social Democratic Party (SPD) and The Greens led by Minister-President Reinhard Höppner, supported by the Party of Democratic Socialism (PDS). The Christian Democratic Union (CDU) suffered major losses, mostly to the national conservative German People's Union (DVU). The Greens fell out of the Landtag. After the election, the SPD formed a new minority government alone with the support of the PDS, and Höppner continued in office.

Parties
The table below lists parties represented in the 2nd Landtag of Saxony-Anhalt.

Election result

|-
! colspan="2" | Party
! Votes
! %
! +/-
! Seats 
! +/-
! Seats %
|-
| bgcolor=| 
| align=left | Social Democratic Party (SPD)
| align=right| 536,501
| align=right| 35.9
| align=right| 1.9
| align=right| 47
| align=right| 11
| align=right| 40.5
|-
| bgcolor=| 
| align=left | Christian Democratic Union (CDU)
| align=right| 329,282
| align=right| 22.0
| align=right| 12.4
| align=right| 28
| align=right| 9
| align=right| 24.1
|-
| bgcolor=| 
| align=left | Party of Democratic Socialism (PDS)
| align=right| 293,475
| align=right| 19.6
| align=right| 0.3
| align=right| 25
| align=right| 4
| align=right| 21.6
|-
| bgcolor=| 
| align=left | German People's Union (DVU)
| align=right| 192,352
| align=right| 12.9
| align=right| 12.9
| align=right| 16
| align=right| 16
| align=right| 13.8
|-
! colspan=8|
|-
| bgcolor=| 
| align=left | Free Democratic Party (FDP)
| align=right| 63,250
| align=right| 4.2
| align=right| 0.7
| align=right| 0
| align=right| ±0
| align=right| 0
|-
| bgcolor=| 
| align=left | Alliance 90/The Greens (Grüne)
| align=right| 48,542
| align=right| 3.2
| align=right| 1.9
| align=right| 0
| align=right| 5
| align=right| 0
|-
| bgcolor=|
| align=left | Others
| align=right| 32,219
| align=right| 2.1
| align=right| 
| align=right| 0
| align=right| ±0
| align=right| 0
|-
! align=right colspan=2| Total
! align=right| 1,495,531
! align=right| 100.0
! align=right| 
! align=right| 116
! align=right| 17
! align=right| 
|-
! align=right colspan=2| Voter turnout
! align=right| 
! align=right| 71.5
! align=right| 16.7
! align=right| 
! align=right| 
! align=right| 
|}

Sources
 Landtagswahl 1998 

1998
1998 elections in Germany